Hemidactylus platycephalus, also known as the tree gecko, flathead leaf-toed gecko, or Baobab gecko, is a species of gecko. It is widely distributed in eastern Africa between Somalia in the north and Mozambique and Madagascar in the south.

References

Hemidactylus
Reptiles of Kenya
Reptiles of Madagascar
Reptiles of Malawi
Reptiles of Mozambique
Reptiles of Somalia
Reptiles of Tanzania
Reptiles of Zambia
Reptiles of Zimbabwe
Reptiles described in 1854
Taxa named by Wilhelm Peters